Jan Mul (20 September 1911 – 30 December 1971) was a Dutch composer, mainly of church music.  He was born in Haarlem and studied with Sem Dresden at the Amsterdam Conservatory; Mul orchestrated Dresden's opera Francois Villon after the composer's death.

Mul died at Overveen, aged 60.

References
Jan Mul official website
List of works

1911 births
1971 deaths
Dutch composers
People from Haarlem
20th-century composers